"Slow Dancing in the Dark" (stylized in all caps) is a song by Japanese-Australian singer-songwriter Joji. It is the second single from his debut album, Ballads 1. The song was written and produced by Joji and Patrick Wimberly.

The song was chosen as BBC Radio 1 DJ Annie Mac's Hottest Record in the World for 18 September 2018.

Music video
A music video for the song was released the same day. Directed by Jared Hogan, the video features Miller in a white tuxedo smoking a cigarette and stumbling through city streets at night in emotional anguish. Later in the video, he is revealed to be a satyr with an arrow in his back. He coughs up blood while splayed on an illuminated dance floor. He eventually collapses in a pool of blood. The final frame is used in the song's cover artwork. The video's visual style has been compared to that of director David Fincher.

Remixes
An acoustic remix of "Slow Dancing in the Dark" was released as a single on 18 October 2018. It features Miller singing over a solo piano backing played by co-producer Carol Kuswanto.

Remixes of the song by Mr. Mitch and Loud Luxury were released on 9 November 2018.

Usage in media
A microwave-like 'ding' sound effect present in the song's pre-chorus spawned an internet challenge on short-form video service TikTok in 2019 known as the "Microwave Challenge". In the challenge, people were asked to spin themselves around while sitting on the floor, imitating food spinning in a microwave.

Personnel

Original version
Credits adapted from Tidal.
 George Miller – songwriting, vocals, arrangement
 Patrick Wimberly – production, recording, mixing, arrangement
 Francisco "Frankie" Ramirez – recording
 Chris Athens – mastering

Acoustic Remix
Credits adapted from Tidal.
 George Miller – production, songwriting, arrangement
 Patrick Wimberly – production, arrangement
 Carol Kuswanto – production
 Francisco "Frankie" Ramirez – mastering, mixing, recording

Charts

Weekly charts

Year-end charts

Certifications

References

2018 songs
2018 singles
Joji (musician) songs
Sentimental ballads
Song recordings produced by Patrick Wimberly
Contemporary R&B songs